Onyama Laura (born Onyama Laura Anyeni on 14 October  1992) is a Cameroonian actress. In 2017, she won CAMIFF Best Actress  awards and Best Cameroonian actress at Ecrans Noirs Film Festival 2016 edition.  Laura, started acting in the movie “Heavy rain” in 2011, “Kiss of the death” in 2015 and others. She is the President of  National Actors' Guild of Cameroon Limbe branch (NAGCAM)

Early life
She was born in Buea general hospital 14 October 1992, a daughter of Onyama Judith. She started her primary school in Buea and later moved to Yaounde, In 2009 she had a degree in Linguistic at the University of Buea. She  is a native of Basossi of  Southwest Region (Cameroon) and  Oshie in the Northwest Region (Cameroon).

Career
Laura, developed interest in acting in 2009 and her first appearance in a movie was in 2011 Heavy Rain.
She is the president of Cameroon Film Guild in Limbe branch

Selected filmography 
 Heavy rain'by Chando Daniel(2011)
 Rebel Pilgrimby Chinepoh Cosson
 Rumbleby Billybob Ndive
 Kiss of the death by Musing Derrick'' 
   Ward Z by Itambi Delphine 
  Dirt Roads by Enah Johnscott 
  Stripped by Enah Johnscott 
  Church street by Nkanya Nkwai
  Saving Mbango by Nkanya Nkwai 
  Fisherman's Diary by

Awards and recognition

See also 
List of Cameroonian Actors
Cinema of Cameroon

References

Living people
Cameroonian film directors
Cameroonian actresses
1992 births
People from Buea